Chevrières is a commune in the Oise department in northern France.

See also 
Communes of the Oise department

References 

Communes of Oise